Burning Bush is an unincorporated community  in Bedford County, Pennsylvania, United States.

References

Unincorporated communities in Bedford County, Pennsylvania
Unincorporated communities in Pennsylvania